Being Human is a supernatural drama television series, based on the BBC series of the same name. It followed the same premise as the original, and starred Sam Huntington, Sam Witwer and Meaghan Rath as a werewolf, a vampire, and a ghost, respectively, who live together as roommates.

The show aired its first episode on January 17, 2011. It came to a close on April 7, 2014.

Plot 
Three roommates seemingly in their twenties each try to keep a secret from the rest of the world. Aidan (Sam Witwer) is a 200-year-old vampire, Josh (Sam Huntington) is a werewolf, and Sally (Meaghan Rath) is a ghost. The three try to help one another navigate the complexities of living double lives while trying to figure out their own at the same time.

Episodes

Series summary

Season 1 

In this season, the first episode opens up with Josh and Aidan moving into an old modern style home which they eventually find out is haunted by a ghost named Sally. They soon become close friends and learn the extremity of their living situation as well as life. By the end of the season the viewers find out just exactly how Aidan came to be a vampire and the background story of Sally's death while also getting a glimpse into Josh's life, as he meets a woman named Nora, with whom he eventually grows a romantic attachment.

Season 2 

After Bishop's death, Aidan has the responsibility of handling all the orphan vampires and managing the vampires of Boston while also realizing his feelings for his old found love interest. During this period of chaos he is faced with trivial decisions that he must answer for, before it is too late. In the meantime, Josh and Nora meet fellow werewolves and go on a dangerous mission to kill Ray (Josh's creator) while Sally fights her inner self and meets her mother again for the first time since she died.

Season 3 

Aidan resurfaces after being buried alive in a coffin and realizes everyone from his vampire family has been swept away. After figuring this out, he too comes face to face with death and has to figure out how to stop it. Nora and Josh meet a young girl and debate how to handle the situation she brings while Liam tries to turn them against Aidan. Sally accidentally runs into someone from her past and has to meet with a witch to try and fix it.

Season 4 

Aidan and Nora make their new home for the moment in a trailer while trying to figure out how to turn Josh back to normal. Aidan learns of a new vampire boss whom he would not expect and tries to convince him otherwise while pursuing his new-found love interest Kat. Nearing the end of the series, Sally comes to terms with her emotions and finally tells a special someone how she truly feels.

Cast and characters

Main cast 

 Sam Witwer as  Aidan Waite, a nearly 260-year-old vampire turned during the Revolutionary War; in the present day, he works as a nurse at Suffolk County Hospital in Boston. He wants to be free of the restrictions of the vampire community, and works for Mother and Suren in season 2, only to fall in love with Suren and be completely excommunicated from vampire society when Suren is installed as Boston's leader. His refusal to comply leads to Suren's death and his burial underground for his indiscretion. However, in the year he has been buried, an influenza virus spreading amongst people turns out to be deadly to vampires, leaving him as one of a few left alive in an effective sea of poison.
 Meaghan Rath as Sally Malik, a ghost who haunts the house Aidan and Josh rent. She was engaged to their landlord, and had planned to live in the house with him before his anger prompted him to push her down the stairs, causing her death. In season 3, after having sent herself to Limbo to save her friends, Josh and Nora employ a witch who uses blood magic to bring Sally back to life. However, she is cursed such that if anyone from her previous life sees her, they will be doomed to die and her soul ultimately belongs to the witch who revived her. She also begins to exhibit zombie-like attributes like skin that tears and rots and a constant hunger for living flesh. Later, Sally reverts to ghost state and seemingly defeats the witch who owned her soul with the help of her three best friends, but only to be dragged into an unknown plane by the deceased witch anyway.
 Sam Huntington as Josh Levison, a werewolf who works as an orderly at the same hospital as Aidan and Nora. Josh does all he can to cure himself of the werewolf curse, seeing it as a medical ailment, until his on-and-off girlfriend Nora, whom he had himself accidentally turned in the season 1 finale, reveals to him in the finale of season 2 that killing the werewolf who turned him while both are still human, is the only way to lift the curse. In season 3, it is revealed he had succeeded in this task, turning him back into a human, and with this new freedom he works at Suffolk County Hospital as a nurse and plans on proposing to Nora. He later is attacked by Liam, a full blood werewolf and leader of a pack, reviving the curse he once got rid of and now is cursed forever. Josh later gains the ability to transform without the moon, and hold some control while transformed demonstrated when he spared Nora's life.
 Mark Pellegrino as James Bishop (season 1; guest, seasons 2–4). Born in England, Bishop became a vampire during the 15th century and turned Aidan into a vampire. In the present day, he is a member of the Boston Police Department. After Aidan kills him, he appears within Aidan's thoughts as an aspect of his psyche. 
 Kristen Hager as Nora Sergeant (seasons 2–4; recurring, season 1), is Josh's former girlfriend, now wife beginning in the end of season 3, and a nurse at the hospital where Aidan and Josh work. During season 1 she becomes pregnant with Josh's child, but later miscarries. At the end of season 1, Nora is scratched by Josh while he is transforming, and the beginning of season 2 sees her as another werewolf. She informs Josh that killing the werewolf who cursed you to begin with while both are still human will remove the curse. Although Josh succeeds in this, the curse is only lifted from him, leaving Nora a werewolf in season 3. She is unique remembering most of what she does in her transformed state.
 Dichen Lachman as Suren (season 2). The daughter of the powerful vampiress known only as "Mother", she is chosen by Mother to take over as head of Boston following Bishop's death. She was put into exile 80 years before for starting a bloody massacre that forced Boston's vampire family into becoming an underground society. In the past, she fell in love with Aidan, although he did not reciprocate for fear of breaching his duties. In the present, he gives into his desires and they attempt to elope, only for Suren to be put to death by Mother.

Recurring cast 
 Sarah Allen as Rebecca Flynt, Aidan's one-night stand, whom he fatally drained of blood in a moment of weakness. Instead of disposing of the body as Aidan had wanted, Bishop had Rebecca revived as a vampire. She initially hates Aidan for leaving her for dead but embraces the dark side of her new existence. Eventually after many struggles trying to live as a vampire, she asks Aidan to end her life in season 1.
 Alison Louder as Emily Levison, Josh's sister. She came out of the closet as a lesbian just before Josh was turned into a werewolf and forced to disappear. She found Josh while visiting her girlfriend who was in the hospital because she broke her arm while "shrooming".
 Gianpaolo Venuta as Danny, Aidan's and Josh's landlord and Sally's ex-fiancé, who may be less friendly and helpful than he appears. After discovering that he was the one who killed Sally, Aidan frightens him with his vampire powers and he turns himself in out of fear. He is imprisoned for the arson and murder, but is killed by his cellmate. He returns as a ghost to attack Sally, but the Reaper shreds him before he can do the same to Sally.
 Terry Kinney as Heggemann, an ancient vampire and elder of the powerful Dutch clan. He was killed by a newly transformed Nora before he could kill Josh on Mother's orders.
 Robert Naylor as Stevie Atkins, a ghost friend of Sally's who killed himself in high school. He is inadvertently brought back to life along with Nick when Josh and Nora revive Sally. He returns to his family, not knowing that he now requires living flesh to survive and eventually kills his parents. After being discovered by Josh and Sally, Stevie kills himself with Josh's assistance, not wanting to live as a monster.
 Kyle Schmid as Henry Durham, a vampire created by Aidan during World War I who reappears in present day, 80 years after Suren's incident helping the orphan vampires. Aidan refers to Henry as his "son". During the influenza epidemic, Henry finds and compels a woman who never had the virus to be his girlfriend, feeding from her and keeping her sealed in a house they share. When Aidan frees her as he feels it is wrong to keep her trapped, Henry struggles to keep his composure and only seek the blood of non-carriers, only to give in, leading to his eventual death at the influenza's effect on vampires.
 Susanna Fournier as Zoe Gonzalez, a nurse at the hospital in the newborn ward who has the ability to see ghosts even though she is alive and not a vampire or werewolf. She has the ability to merge ghosts' souls with the newborns as a form of reincarnation as well as merge her subconscious with a ghost's. She falls in love with Nick, Sally's crush in life and former boyfriend in death.
 Natalie Brown as Julia, Josh's ex-fiancée and Aidan's ex-girlfriend. She works at the same hospital as Josh, Aidan, and Nora, and still has feelings for Josh. She discovers that Josh is a werewolf due to a solar eclipse forcing him to partially turn in public and is then hit by a car and dies from her injuries.
 Amy Aquino as Donna Gilchrist, a witch who works at a soup kitchen who helps Josh and Nora bring Sally back to life by reanimating her corpse and giving it life. However, she uses the events to acquire Ray's lifeless corpse for her own use, and anyone who sees Sally that is from her life before she died, is doomed to die, with their spirit sent to her so she may eat it and make herself stronger.
 Dusan Dukic as Reaper/Scott, the thing that has been haunting Sally. He has the job of shredding ghosts who have over stayed on Earth. Sally and the others later learn Reaper is a dark version of Sally herself and tormenting her. It takes the name Scott and appears in her subconscious to take over her spirit. She overcomes his powers and frees herself from him, but he still exists as a part of her.
 Deena Aziz as "Mother", the head of all the vampires. She is the most powerful vampire in the series and is Suren's biological mother. Mother also made Suren a vampire. She puts Suren in charge of Boston, and orders Aidan to support Suren to succeed and she will free him from the confines of vampire society in return. Mother, along with many other vampires, are killed due to a mutant strain of influenza that is fatal to vampires.
 Pat Kiely as Nick Fenn, a ghost and old collegemate of Sally's.  He and Zoe start dating, much to Sally's dismay. Nick is inadvertently brought back to life along with Stevie when Josh and Nora revive Sally. After discovering he needs living flesh to survive, Nick baits stray cats to his home with food then kills and eats them. Zoe comes home and discovers him eating a cat; Nick, still overwhelmed by the hunger for living flesh, attacks her and Zoe is forced to kill him.
 Jesse Rath as Robbie Malik, Sally's younger brother. Robbie shows up out of the blue to evict Josh, Nora, and Aiden from the house they live in, owned by his and Sally's father.  While there, doing some repairs, he is electrocuted and killed, and becomes a ghost like his sister. (Notably, Jesse is the real-life younger brother of actress Meaghan Rath who plays Sally in the series.)
 Connor Price as Kenny, a vampire who, turned by Aiden, now acts as the leader of the vampire community in Boston. Killed in the penultimate episode during a struggle against Aiden.
 Rhiannon Moller-Trotter as Jackie, Emily's girlfriend who falls down during a shrooming accident and ends up in the hospital.
 Bobby Campo as Max (season 3), an employee at the Howell & Holt funeral home.

Director information 

 Toby Whithouse is an English actor, stand-up comedian and screenwriter. His highest-profile work has been the creation of the BBC Three supernatural television series Being Human. He also appeared in the film version Bridget Jones Diary in 2001 as Alistair.
 Jeremy Carver is an American television writer and producer best known for his work on The CW series Supernatural, and as the co-developer of the North American version of Being Human and television adaption of the film Frequency.
 Anne Fricke is an American television writer and producer best known for her work on shows like Dawson's Creek, Everwood, Men in Trees and Privileged and as the co-creator of the North American version of Being Human.

Production and development 
On June 28, 2010, Entertainment Weekly reported that actor Sam Witwer had signed on to play the vampire in the remake, and Meaghan Rath had signed to play the ghost with Sam Huntington close to a deal to play the werewolf. On July 7, 2010, it was announced that Lost and Supernatural alumnus Mark Pellegrino would be joining the cast as "Aidan's charismatic but menacing mentor Bishop".

On March 17, 2011, Syfy announced that they would be ordering a second season of its new drama series, slated to begin airing January 16, 2012.

On June 29, 2011, Variety reported that actress Dichen Lachman had signed on as a regular to play a reclusive vampire in season two.

Husband-and-wife team Jeremy Carver and Anna Fricke were tasked with adapting the British series for North American television. Carver said that he and Fricke hoped "to use elements of the original series while reimagining a series all of our own. I think that starts with many of the new characters and storylines that we created. I think you're going to see a show that gives a very nice nod to the original version." Carver and Fricke said they intended to retain the original program's dark and morally ambiguous qualities.

The first 13-episode season roughly follows the narrative arc of season one of the British original; however, the British version was only six episodes, so the North American program developed new stories and arcs to fill out the story line enough for 13 episodes. Some similar elements were also developed in a different manner; Carver said, "We explore these moments and what the characters experienced in the British version and say to the writers, 'What if we do this differently?" However, elements of the directorial style of the first two episodes followed the original pilot and first regular episode of the UK series, in some cases shot-for-shot.

One explicit tribute to the British series is the name of the vampire, Aidan; the character is named after Irish actor Aidan Turner, who played the vampire Mitchell in the original series. The other main characters in the North American version at first appear to correspond to their British counterparts (werewolves Josh and George, ghosts Sally and Annie, vampire leaders Bishop and Herrick), but actor Sam Witwer was keen to stress the differences between the characters in the two programs: "These are not the same characters.... There are a lot of similarities, but for example, Bishop is not Herrick. Not in the slightest. He's not the same guy."

The North American series' writers, and actors, had avoided watching the British second series when it aired on BBC America until after they had finished filming their (North American) first season. Witwer told an interviewer that he had watched only the first episode, and avoided watching any more in order to avoid subconsciously mimicking Irish actor Aidan Turner's performance. At San Diego Comic Con 2011's Being Human panel, the actors confirmed that since finishing filming the first season they had finally caught up with watching the British series, but that the writers would deliberately maintain their policy of not watching anything beyond the first series of the British Being Human, in order to ensure the North American series developed down different paths as they moved into the second season.

On February 8, 2012, Syfy announced that they would be ordering a third season of the drama series. set to premiere on January 14, 2013.

On April 10, 2013, Syfy announced that they were renewing Being Human for a fourth, with 13 episodes set to air.

Reception 
According to Bill Gorman from the website TV by the Numbers, season one's premiere episodes of Being Human averaged 1.8 million viewers, making it Syfy's most successful winter season scripted series launch since 2005. "Through its first nine weeks on Syfy, and including repeat broadcasts, Being Human [was] seen by 19.1 million total unique viewers."

Notably, the show's audience was as high as 52% female during the second season, a first for the SyFy network.

Awards and nominations

See also

List of ghost films
List of vampire television series
Vampire film
Being Human (UK TV series)

References

External links 

 
 
 Interview With 'Being Human' Cast at TV Squad
 Being Human Syfy Digital Press Tour Season 2 Full Panel video in Multipleverses video vault

2010s American comedy-drama television series
2010s American horror television series
2010s American supernatural television series
2011 American television series debuts
2014 American television series endings
2010s Canadian comedy-drama television series
2011 Canadian television series debuts
2014 Canadian television series endings
Being Human (TV series)
American television series based on British television series
American horror fiction television series
English-language television shows
American fantasy television series
CTV Sci-Fi Channel original programming
Horror drama television series
Syfy original programming
Serial drama television series
Television shows filmed in Montreal
Television shows set in Massachusetts
Television series by Muse Entertainment
Television series by Universal Content Productions
Television series by Banijay
Television series about ghosts
Vampires in television
Television about werewolves
Canadian horror fiction television series
Canadian television series based on British television series
American fantasy drama television series